Amongst the Medici is a radio documentary series by historian Bettany Hughes. The series aired in three parts on BBC Radio 4 between February–March 2006.

The series was billed as "a three part re-evaluation of one of the most creative and complicated partnerships in the western world" and examined the history of the Medici family during the Italian Renaissance, between 1397 (the founding of the Medici Bank) and 1497 (the Bonfire of the Vanities).

 Part 1 - Bankers to the Renaissance (audio)
 Part 2 - Renaissance, what renaissance? (audio)
 Part 3 - Smart women, gay men and false gods (audio)

External links 
 Amongst the Medici - BBC Radio 4 (official)
Reviews
 Critic's Choice - The Financial Times (22/02/06)
 Radio review - The Guardian (23/02/06)
 Radio: Filthy lucre - The Spectator (25/02/06)

BBC Radio 4 programmes
House of Medici
Italian Renaissance
Radio documentaries
Documentaries about historical events